Justice Jyotirmay Bhattacharya (born 25 September 1956) was the former Acting Chief Justice at the Calcutta High Court from October 2017 to April 2018 and was the Chief Justice of the High Court at Calcutta from 1st May 2018 to September 2018.

Education
Bhattacharya was born in South 24 Parganas, where he was educated at Baruipur High School.  Afterward, he went to St. Xavier's College, Calcutta and got his LL. B. degree from the University of Calcutta.

Career
Bhattacharya enrolled at the Bar in March 1983. He started practising in the Civil and Writ Jurisdictions of the Calcutta High Court. In 2003, he was appointed a Permanent Judge at the court.

Notable judgements
 A High Court bench presided by Bhattacharya held in September 2012 that land acquisition along certain stretches of Kolkata Metro stood lapsed on account of compensation not being awarded to the tenants within the stipulated period. This was in response to a writ petition filed by Central Calcutta Citizens' Welfare Association.

References

1956 births
20th-century Indian lawyers
21st-century Indian judges
Judges of the Calcutta High Court
Living people
People from South 24 Parganas district
St. Xavier's College, Kolkata alumni